Lisa Kelly (born December 8, 1980) is an American trucker who has been featured on the History channel reality television series Ice Road Truckers and its spinoff series IRT: Deadliest Roads. For seasons 3–5 and 7–11, Ice Road Truckers followed Kelly and her fellow drivers as they make their way along the icy Dalton Highway from Fairbanks to Prudhoe Bay, frequently hauling "oversized" loads. Kelly has also made appearances in Seasons 1–2 of IRT: Deadliest Roads. Kelly was notable as the only female trucker featured in the series until Maya Sieber joined in Season 5, and Stephanie "Steph" Custance in season 10. Originally from Grand Rapids, Michigan, she now resides in Wasilla, Alaska.

Early life
Kelly was born on December 8, 1980, in Grand Rapids, Michigan. Her family moved to a mini farm in Sterling, Alaska, when she was six years old. She returned to Grand Rapids for college, attending Cornerstone University for one semester before deciding it was not for her.

Career
Prior to her appointment as an Ice Road Trucker, Kelly worked as a school bus driver and motocross rider. She also worked at gas stations, and a pizza company and was a state freestyle motocross champion. After these ventures, she decided to settle on a long term-career and trained as a trucker because it 'looked interesting'. She subsequently got a job driving for Carlile Transportation, an Alaskan haulage company. Being a woman, Kelly says this was a difficult achievement. "I had to work twice as hard. I had to pull my weight and everybody else's and get the job done as fast, or faster."

TV appearances
Kelly is one of the truckers for the History Channel's Ice Road Truckers. She first appeared in season 3 (Seasons 1 and 2 had been set in Canada) in 2009, as the only woman.  She subsequently took part in season 4 (in 2010) and season 5 and 7. 

She also took part in the History Channel's Ice Road Truckers: Deadliest Roadsalong with Rick Yemm, Dave Redmon and Alex Debogorski trucking in the Himalayas in India; in a later season, she drove in Bolivia and Peru.

Journalist Kaye O'Hara claims that Kelly was offered a contract to return to the show for season six, but she declined it. According to show's producer Kelly was taking a year off. Kelly returned in season 7, and on season 9, she was working in Darrell Ward's new company before his death following season 10. She appeared in season 11, the final season for Ice Road Truckers.

Personal life
In 2008, Lisa married Traves Kelly, after dating him for four years. He is full Aleut Native Alaskan and an avid dirtbiker.  They have no children. Her hobbies include motocross, horse riding, skydiving, hang gliding, and snowboarding. She owns a miniature horse named Rocky and a cat named Tanzi.

References

External links
 
 Interview with Esquire magazine (June 11, 2010)
 Interview with North Shore Journal (June 21, 2009)
 Interview with The Hindu (February 20, 2012)

American truck drivers
Living people
People from Wasilla, Alaska
1980 births
People from Grand Rapids, Michigan
Cornerstone University alumni